Gastrophrynoides borneensis is a species of frog in the family Microhylidae. It is endemic to Borneo and is known from Sarawak and Sabah in Malaysia, but it is likely to be also found in adjacent Kalimantan (Indonesia). Common name Borneo narrowmouth toad has been coined for it.

Gastrophrynoides borneensis is a lowland forest species that occurs in leaf-litter of the forest floor. It is threatened by habitat loss caused by clear-cutting.

References

borneensis
Endemic fauna of Borneo
Endemic fauna of Malaysia
Amphibians of Malaysia
Amphibians described in 1897
Taxa named by George Albert Boulenger
Taxonomy articles created by Polbot
Amphibians of Borneo